Philipp Aschenwald (born 12 November 1995) is an Austrian ski jumper.

He participated at the FIS Nordic World Ski Championships 2019, winning a medal.

References

External links

1995 births
Living people
Austrian male ski jumpers
FIS Nordic World Ski Championships medalists in ski jumping
People from Schwaz District
Sportspeople from Tyrol (state)
21st-century Austrian people